, also known as RIN: Daughters of Mnemosyne, is a six-episode Japanese anime television series produced by Xebec and Genco. The anime was produced to commemorate the tenth anniversary of the AT-X network, which it originally aired on. Funimation licensed the series in North America. The plot, rich in the mix of murder and action, is set in modern and near-future Tokyo, and revolves around Rin Asougi, an immortal private investigator. A light novel and a manga adaptation have also been published.

Plot
A mysterious tree known as Yggdrasil would often appear in the world of the humans, releasing many small orbs into the human world. A small proportion of the orbs are special ones known as "Time Fruits". If a Time Fruit enters a female, she becomes Immortal. If a Time Fruit enters a male, he becomes a crazed winged being known as an "Angel". Rin Asougi is an immortal who runs a private investigation agency in Tokyo's Shinjuku district alongside her assistant, Mimi who is also immortal. Rin often converses with a mysterious unknown individual on the phone. She is often being hunted down by an assassin named Laura who was hired by Apos, an angel who persecutes immortals and is the current guardian of the Yggdrasil.

The story begins in the year 1990. During a search for a missing cat, Rin instead finds Koki Maeno, a young man with distorted memories. As she investigates his past, she discovers that he is a clone created by Sayara Yamanobe, a woman searching for immortality. After discovering this, Koki decides to work for Rin in her agency. In 2011, Koki marries a former client, Yuki. Sayara Yamanobe returns, kidnaps Rin and attempts to attack Japan with biological weapons. Koki, after becoming an Angel, sacrifices himself to save Rin and Japan. In 2025, Rin ends up investigating a case involving Koki's son, Teruki, after he meets his long-term cyber girlfriend in reality. Rin manages to save Teruki; however, she ends up sacrificing herself.

In the year 2055, Rin has lost her memory and goes by the name Tamaki Saito. She had fallen in love with a mortal man named Ihika. However, she regains her memories when Laura discovers she's alive and attempts to kill her. After Apos kidnaps Rin, Mimi and Teruki's daughter Mishio travel to Apos' castle to save her. Rin is locked in a room with an angel and kills him, later discovering him to be Ihika. It is revealed that the unknown man on the phone was Tajimamori, Rin's savior from a thousand years earlier, a former guardian of the Yggdrasil, and Apos' father. After impregnating Rin, he is killed by Apos, who is himself locked away in the roots of the Yggdrasil. Later, Rin gives birth to a baby boy, who will one day become the tree's new guardian.

Characters

Main characters

The protagonist of the series. Her appearance is that of someone in her mid-twenties but her real age is unknown, but she has stated to be born some time in the 11th century. In episode six, she says she has been looking for Tajimamori for a thousand years, making her at least a millennium old. She usually wears a black suit and glasses. Her whimsical personality serves as a front for a cunning, ruthless mind and extraordinary martial art skills. She always keeps a number of throwing blades and a garrote wire concealed on her body. At some point in the past, a "Fruit of Time" (also known as a "time fruit") entered Rin's body, effectively making her immortal, unable to age, and capable of surviving and regenerating from a phenomenal amount of bodily damage. In episode four, she is sucked inside a running jet engine and regenerates her entire body over 25 years, albeit at the cost of all her memories (they return when she is briefly killed by Laura). In episode five, Apos removes Rin's time fruit, seemingly killing her just like Sayara and Maeno before, but it is revealed in episode six that an immortal's death is not permanent as long as her time fruit remains intact. Rin's time fruit is then brought to Apos' castle, where its proximity to Yggdrasil, the fabled source of all time fruits, speeds up her revival, which would have normally taken many decades. She and Mimi run the detective business Asogi Consulting together in West Shinjuku until their office is demolished in episode four.

Rin's assistant, who is also an immortal. Mimi has a bright personality and is fond of alcoholic drinks despite having the appearance of someone in her teens. Her job scope includes financial management, information processing, and other miscellaneous tasks. She cares for Rin very much and would do anything to ensure her safety, even while nagging her to do the job properly. She feels indebted to Rin as Rin saved her from being devoured by an angel during their first encounter and has been protecting her ever since. She is a formidable hacker but is outmatched by Katsuyuki Kamiyama in episode four. After Rin disappears in episode four, she leaves with Genta and becomes a Buddhist nun. In episode six, believing there still being a chance that Rin is still alive, Mimi constantly displays her resolve in rescuing Rin from Apos' sadistic scheme.

Maeno family

A young man with distorted memory whom Rin accidentally saves in episode one. He is, in fact, a clone created by Aoyama Pharmaceutical company. The original Koki Maeno died during an experiment that involved his vivisection. His memory lacks realism, as it is actually the memory of the original Koki written into the clone's brain by artificial means. After discovering the truth, he chooses to keep on living and starts working at Asougi Consulting, where he spends the next twenty-one years. Some time between episodes two and three, he marries Yuki Shimazaki and has a son named Teruki with her.
In episode three, he is shot by Sayara while rescuing Rin, and has to consume Shogo Shimazaki's time fruit in order to survive as an angel. After saving Rin and having one last tender moment with her, he returns to consume Sayara, but is killed (unlike that of immortals, the death of an angel is permanent regardless the time fruit) by Apos before he can finish. Koki's time fruit is lost in the sea but is inexplicably found by Rin while she regenerates in the ocean between episodes four and five. His granddaughter Mishio acquires it after Rin's body is destroyed in episode five, unwittingly brings it to Apos' castle in episode six, and passes it to Rin as the latter is consumed by Yggdrasil. Koki's spirit then helps Rin to break free.
 née 

Koki's wife, whom he meets in episode two. During Koki's involvement in the case of her brother Shogo, the two grow fond of each other and marry some time between episodes two and three. In episode three, they have a son named Teruki. After Koki's death, Yuki continued to raise Teruki alone.

Yuki's older brother, who becomes an angel prior to episode two. Although most angels succumb to their primal desires quickly, Shogo's exceptional willpower allows him to retain consciousness for a very long time, which he uses to exact revenge upon people who previously maltreated him. After he finally loses his consciousness and attacks Rin, she has to kill him by impaling him with a tree branch. Apos expresses desire to obtain Shogo's time fruit but Rin instead gives it to Maeno, who eventually uses it to become an angel himself, saving Rin from Sayara. After Maeno is killed by Apos, his time fruit falls into the ocean and is lost until episode five.

Koki and Yuki's only son, who first appears as a child in episode three and becomes the male lead in episode four. Some time between episodes three and four, Rin saves his life in a car accident, and he states that he has felt watched over and protected by her ever since. Their formal introduction takes place in episode four, when Tamotsu brings him to Asougi Consulting due to his involvement in the Ruon case. He appears again in episode five, now the CEO of Maeno Holding Group company, with a teenage daughter named Mishio.

Teruki Maeno's only daughter and Koki's granddaughter, first appearing as a teenager in episode five. Finding Teruki's old video of Rin, she starts investigating her, frequently comparing herself to Sherlock Holmes. Upon the first meeting, they quickly grow fond of each other, and Mishio sticks with Rin and Mimi for the rest of the series. In episode six, Rin explains that Mishio is the youngest of Tajimamori's descendants.

Antagonists

The primary antagonist of the series. As revealed in episode five, Apos is a hermaphrodite, or more properly an intersex person, possessing qualities of both an angel and an immortal, which, according to him, makes him a "god". He seems to have no concept of human morals but instead, has a sadistic sense of amusement and beauty. In the early episodes, Apos demonstrates interest in Rin, to the point that he hires mortal killers to target her. In episode three, he reveals that he is after Rin's time fruit. Apparently, time fruits contain the immortals' memories and Apos enjoys consuming them. It is also revealed that he has the ability to instantly remove the fruits from both immortals and angels (thus killing them). Anyone else wishing to kill an immortal must physically dig through their victim's flesh for the time fruit. In episode six, Apos is revealed to be the child of Tajimamori, the previous Guardian of Yggdrasil, and the current Guardian himself. Guardians are supposed to switch every once in a (long) while, but Apos desires to become a permanent guardian by sacrificing Rin to Yggdrasil.

An assassin skilled with firearms and other weapons who is repeatedly sent to assassinate Rin by Apos. Although Rin kills Laura in most of the engagements, Apos resurrects her so that she can attack Rin again. In episode four, she becomes a cyborg, though the extent of her transformation is left open. Episode five reveals that Laura is in possession of an android body designed to resemble Rin and telepathically linked to Apos' torture victim, and she further elaborates in episode six that only her brain remains immortal, apparently as the result of Apos' sadistic manipulations. Rin extracts the Fruit of Time from there and feeds it into Apos at Laura's own request so that he would feel her memory and pain.

The head of the Aoyama Pharmaceutical research lab in Sayama. Originally researching bacteria, she discovered one that could be the key to cloning, moving on to conduct illegal cloning experiments aiming to achieve immortality. She has a sadistic personality, often torturing her captives to death. In episode one, Sayara is last seen being surrounded by the delirious zombies she created. In episode three, she is revealed to have been saved by Apos in the last moment, who injects her with a time fruit after her body is already considerably mutilated. As a result, she remains forever crippled and waits twenty-one years until a powered exoskeleton capable of supporting her is invented. After one last confrontation with Rin and Maeno, she is finally killed by Apos, who removes and consumes her time fruit.

The antagonist in episode four. The daughter of the "modern von Neumann" Katsuyuki Kamiyama, Ruon's consciousness was removed from her body by Katsuyuki and uploaded onto the net (2.0) as an artificial intelligence, effectively killing her in real life (1.0). Katsuyuki implies that this event was the cause of Great Network Crisis of 2020. Ruon spends five years posing as an online sex doll until she becomes infatuated with Teruki because he is the first person to want to meet her offline. Following the events of the episode, her physical (android) form is destroyed through an airplane jet engine.

Others

A police investigator and a close acquaintance of Rin, first introduced in episode one. He enjoys Rin's company and provides her with useful information. He is killed by a military sniper following AI Ruon's orders in episode four. Immediately before his death, he reminisces about what may have been an intimate moment with Rin. He is affectionately referred to as "Tamo" by Rin, and despite his constant (bad) attempts to keep their meetings low-key during the first two episodes, he does not object to being called by that name.

Rin and Mimi's female dog who lives at their office. As an immortal, she does not age throughout the series and survives being shot on multiple occasions without any visible lasting injuries. Mimi takes her with her after the Asougi Consulting office is demolished in episode four. Genta is killed in episode five, leaving only ashes behind, just like human immortals whose time fruits are removed.

 (first)
 (second)
 (Japanese) (third)
A group or organization of women who provide Rin and Mimi with crucial information in regards to their investigations throughout the series and whose names have never been revealed. The first informant is introduced in episode two and is mentioned to have died prior to episode four. The second informant is introduced as an assistant of the first one in episode three and inherits her position in the next episode. In return for their services, both demand sex with either Rin or Mimi. Mimi is extremely uncomfortable and unnerved by this at first but seems to have entered into some sort of relationship with the second informant by episode four. In episode six, the second informant is apparently dead as well, replaced by a third one, with whom Mimi keeps a strictly professional relationship. In episode 3 during their search for information on Rin, Koki Maeno was forced to watch the informants have sex with Mimi or else no information would be given. All three informants showed a fondness for grasshoppers.

Rin's mortal lover after she loses her memories in episode five. He proposes to her twice in the episode but is killed by Laura soon after Rin accepts his second proposal. In episode six, Ihika is revived by Apos in his castle as an angel and chained next to Rin to torment her. Rin, seeing him in a berserk frenzy and about to break free, is then forced to kill him in self-defense, realizing his identity only as he turns into ashes. His time fruit is lost when Laura throws it out of the window.

Finally identified in episode six, Tajimamori is the previous Guardian of Yggdrasil and the father of Apos. According to a legend told in episode five, he was once tasked by an emperor to find a Fruit of Time for him but when he discovered it, the emperor already died. The legend is based upon Shinto myths. As a Guardian of Yggdrasil, he doesn't age but isn't invulnerable like the immortals. He can grow angelic wings like Apos and his presence has the same effect on Mimi as an angel's, but he doesn't exhibit the primal savageness of regular angels. He is seen talking to Rin on the phone throughout the series, often in an intimate or fatherly manner. In episode six, it is revealed that he and Rin fell in love with each other over a thousand years ago, but he chose to distance himself from her. He is also revealed to be the progenitor of the Maeno line which tied all his descendants' fate to Rin's. Shortly before his death at Apos' hands in episode six, Tajimamori fathers a child with Rin.

Media

Print media
A light novel adaptation titled  was serialized in Hobby Japan's light novel magazine Charano! between the January and September 2008 issues. The light novel is written by the writer of the anime, Hiroshi Ōnogi, and illustrated by Chūō Higashiguchi. A single volume containing five chapters was released on April 1, 2009.

A manga adaptation illustrated by Miss Black serialized two chapters in Kill Time Communication's male-oriented manga magazine Comic Valkyrie volume 12 on May 27, 2008 and volume 13 on July 26, 2008, respectively.

Anime
Mnemosyne is a six-episode television series of 45-minute episodes directed by Shigeru Ueda and written by Hiroshi Ōnogi. The animation was handled by Xebec, but planning and production was shared with Genco, that also had a part in the original concept creation. Original character design is by Chūō Higashiguchi, and was used as a template by the character designer for the anime version, Mitsuru Ishihara. Music direction was headed by Takayuki Negishi. The series' opening theme is "Alsatia" and the ending theme is "Cause Disarray"; both songs were written by Yama-B, composed by Syu, and performed by Galneryus. Funimation licensed Mnemosyne in February 2009 for a North American release under the title RIN ~Daughters of Mnemosyne~.

The series was produced by the Yggdrasil Executive Committee which included Xebec and Genco. The plot of the episodes is set in Tokyo and revolves around Rin Asōgi, an immortal private investigator, as she explores the secrets of modern and near-future world and the supernatural events that surround the fictional society of immortals like herself. There are large time gaps in the internal chronology between the first five episodes, ranging from one to thirty years.

The six episodes were broadcast monthly on AT-X channel in Japan, between February 3 and July 6, 2008. Each episode is 45 minutes long. Two pieces of theme music are used for the episodes: the opening theme "Alsatia" and the ending theme "Cause Disarray". Both were composed and performed by the Japanese metal band Galneryus. The series was produced to commemorate the tenth anniversary of the AT-X network it originally aired on.

Reception
Zac Bertschy from Anime News Network regards Mnemosyne as a "totally edgy anime for adults" that he felt "like halfway-decent dark erotica" that presents some unique ideas for the plot. He acknowledges that "it's difficult to honestly care about any of these characters" but its confusing and yet compelling aspects grasp the audience's attention. He criticized the amount of violence and sex that resulted in exhaustion and unpleasantness that led to "the whole trashy appeal". In conclusion, this is a series that should not be taken seriously and recommended it to those who are looking for "fun, weird, entertaining sleaze without a hint of irony or cutesiness". Others differ from Bertschy's interpretation. Tom Tonthat argues that Mnemosyne features animation which is memorable and tells a good story, with mundane cases spiraling into sinister plots that endanger humanity itself, but is also a clearly adult series due to the level of nudity and sex. He adds that while the anime series is an "erotic thriller" it has high production values with some beautifully animated and well-choreographed fights between characters. This is coupled with an engaging story and each episode representing a year of the timeline between 1990 to 2055, including different technological developments which either change characters or the plot. He ends the review by stating that this anime does a good job of telling a story, a "guilty pleasure anime" for which you should give much thought to the "blood smoothie or angel sex," concluding it is a form of "supernatural film noir" worth a look at, although hindered by the "heavy use of shocking sex and violence."

On June 12, 2015, the Chinese Ministry of Culture listed Rin: Daughters of Mnemosyne among 38 anime and manga titles banned in China.

References

External links
Funimation's official Rin ~Daughters of Mnemosyne~ website
Xebec's official Mnemosyne website 
Comic Valkyrie's official Mnemosyne manga website 
 
 

2008 Japanese television series debuts
2008 Japanese television series endings
2008 Japanese novels
2008 manga
Action anime and manga
Anime with original screenplays
Censored television series
Funimation
HJ Bunko
Japanese LGBT-related animated television series
Light novels
Neo-noir television series
Novels set in Tokyo
Seinen manga
Supernatural anime and manga
Television censorship in China
Yuri (genre) anime and manga
Yuri (genre) light novels
Xebec (studio)
IG Port franchises
Works banned in China
Fiction about immortality
Occult detective anime and manga
AT-X (TV network) original programming